Azman bin Ibrahim is a Malaysian politician and currently serves as Terengganu State Executive Councillor.

Election Results

Controversies

Sexist stance against women 
On 7 February 2023, Ibrahim use an analogy to liken women to item, leading to criticisms by Malaysian netizens. Former inspector-general of police (IGP) Musa Hassan refuted that "It doesn't matter how one should dress. It is the duty of the police to receive reports in whatever situation.", while rage among netizens soar. However, Ibrahim justified his claim and refused to apologize.

Racist remark against Malaysian Chinese
 In January 2023, Ibrahim made a "sarcastic" remark by referring the stabilization of pork prices as "fate of the Chinese people". Netizens criticized Ibrahim, citing that this is a racist remark against Chinese minority, as non-muslims in the nation also consume pork.
 In February 2023, After authorities are called to investigate into the illegal and controversial "jihad march" hold by Islamic Party earlier in February 2023, Ibrahim defended his compatriots' acts by tweeting a picture of a Chinese immigrant working as a coachman for Malays with the description "Once upon a time in my homeland...", hinting that Chinese people should not be treated as equal as Malays do. This led to huge criticism not only by Malay-Chinese netizens, but also from the Malaysian Chinese Association. Some slammed Ibrahim for "insinuating the low status of (Malay) Chinese in the past", while some believed that the Islamic Party is trying to incite hate against minorities.

References

Malaysian Islamic Party politicians
Members of the Terengganu State Legislative Assembly
Terengganu state executive councillors
21st-century Malaysian politicians
Living people
Year of birth missing (living people)
People from Terengganu
Malaysian people of Malay descent
Malaysian Muslims